Jens Dyhr Okking, (18 December 1939 – 21 January 2018) was a Danish actor, singer and politician.

Jens Okking was mostly known outside of Denmark from Lars von Triers TV-series The Kingdom. In Denmark, Okking was a notable actor for many years, both in theatre, films and TV series and he also worked as theatre director. Apart from his acting, Okking performed as a singer throughout his career, including many recordings with a variety of musicians, mainly from Denmark. He also used his voice to record several audiobooks, mostly for children, and in radio plays for the Danish Broadcasting Corporation (DR).

Jens Okking was a member of the European Parliament in 1999–2003, initially elected for the June Movement, but he later changed affiliation to the People's Movement against the EU.

Filmography (selected) 
A selection of films Okking participated in includes:

 The Only Way (1970)
  (1971)
  (1971)
 Olsen-bandens store kup (1972)
  (1972)
 Olsen-banden går amok (1973)
  (1973)
 Nitten røde roser (1974)
 Familien Gyldenkål (1975)
 Familien Gyldenkål sprænger banken (1976)
 Strømer (1976)
  (1977)
 Affæren i Mølleby (1976)
  (1976)
  (1977)
  (1977)
 Pas på ryggen, professor (1977)
  (1978)
 Slægten (1978)
 Mig og Charly (1978)
 Honning Måne (1978)
 The Witch Hunt (1981)
  (1981)
  (1981)
  (1983)
 Zappa (1983)
  (1987)
  (1988)
 Miraklet i Valby (1989)
 Gøngehøvdingen – 1992 som Kaptajn Mannheimer.
 Det forsømte forår (1993)
 Riget I (1994)
  (1995)
  (1996)
 Barbera (1997)
 Riget II (1997)
 At klappe med een hånd (2001)
  (2001)
 Old Men in New Cars (2002)
 Inkasso (2004)
  (2004)
  (2005)
 Solkongen (2005)
  (2005)
  (2006)

References

External links 
 
 
 

1939 births
2018 deaths
Best Actor Bodil Award winners
Danish actor-politicians
Danish male film actors
June Movement MEPs
Male actors from Copenhagen
MEPs for Denmark 1999–2004
Politicians from Copenhagen